Group A was one of two pools in the Americas Zone Group II of the 1998 Fed Cup. Eight teams competed in a round robin competition, with the top team advancing to Group I in 1999.

Mexico vs. Bermuda

El Salvador vs. Barbados

Haiti vs. Guatemala

Costa Rica vs. Antigua and Barbuda

Mexico vs. Antigua and Barbuda

El Salvador vs. Haiti

Guatemala vs. Costa Rica

Barbados vs. Bermuda

Mexico vs. Barbados

El Salvador vs. Costa Rica

Haiti vs. Bermuda

Guatemala vs. Antigua and Barbuda

Mexico vs. Guatemala

El Salvador vs. Antigua and Barbuda

Haiti vs. Barbados

Costa Rica vs. Bermuda

Mexico vs. Haiti

El Salvador vs. Guatemala

Costa Rica vs. Barbados

Bermuda vs. Antigua and Barbuda

Mexico vs. El Salvador

Haiti vs. Costa Rica

Guatemala vs. Bermuda

Barbados vs. Antigua and Barbuda

Mexico vs. Costa Rica

El Salvador vs. Bermuda

Haiti vs. Antigua and Barbuda

Guatemala vs. Barbados

  placed first in the pool, and thus advanced to Group I in 1999, where they placed fourth in their pool of five.

See also
Fed Cup structure

References

External links
 Fed Cup website

1998 Fed Cup Americas Zone